Siobhan O'Sullivan is an Australian political scientist and political theorist who is currently an associate professor in the School of Social Sciences, University of New South Wales. Her research has focused, among other things, on animal welfare policy and the welfare state. She is the author of Animals, Equality and Democracy (2011, Palgrave Macmillan) and a coauthor of Getting Welfare to Work (2015, Oxford University Press) and Buying and Selling the Poor (2022, Sydney University Press). She co-edited Contracting-out Welfare Services (2015, Wiley) and The Political Turn in Animal Ethics (2016, Rowman & Littlefield International). She is founding host of the regular animal studies podcast Knowing Animals.

Career
Siobhan O'Sullivan read for a PhD in government and international relations in the Faculty of Economics and Business, University of Sydney, where she was supervised by Lyn Carson. Her thesis, entitled Animal Visibility and Equality in Liberal Democratic States: A Study Into Animal Ethics and the Nature of Bias in Animal Protection Regulation, was submitted in May 2007. It was examined by Denise Russell and Robert Garner. O'Sullivan graduated in 2008. In that same year, she became a research fellow at the School of Social and Political Sciences at the University of Melbourne, spending some time at Clark University, Massachusetts, as a part of the Human-Animal Studies Fellowship program. The research that went into her PhD project subsequently formed the basis of her 2011 book Animals, Equality and Democracy, published by Palgrave Macmillan in conjunction with the Oxford Centre for Animal Ethics as part of the Palgrave Macmillan Animal Ethics Series, edited by Andrew Linzey and Priscilla Cohn.

O'Sullivan was based at the University of Melbourne for seven years, and subsequently became a lecturer in social policy in the School of Social Sciences, University of New South Wales. In 2015, her Getting Welfare to Work: Street Level Governance in Australia, the UK and the Netherlands (coauthored with Mark Considine, Jenny M. Lewis and Els Sol) was published with Oxford University Press, and the edited collection Contracting-out Welfare Services: Comparing National Policy Designs for Unemployment Assistance, edited by O'Sullivan and Considine, was published with Wiley. Another collection, The Political Turn in Animal Ethics, co-edited by O'Sullivan and Robert Garner, was published by Rowman & Littlefield in 2016. In August 2020, O'Sullivan was diagnosed with ovarian cancer. She become a spokesperson for the Ovarian Cancer Research Foundation and established animal studies prizes with the Australasian Animal Studies Association. In 2022, she published Buying and Selling the Poor, co-authored with Michael McGann and Mark Considine, with Sydney University Press. While living with cancer, O'Sullivan publicly campaigned for the legalisation of assisted dying in New South Wales; Alex Greenwich's Voluntary Assisted Dying Bill 2021 was passed in May 2022.

Research
On the website of the University of New South Wales, O'Sullivan is listed as conducting research into "the delivery of contracted employment services in Australia, the UK, and around the world". Her research interests are listed as the welfare state, "mission drift", animal welfare policy and environmental ethics. In addition to her published work, she has contributed to research reports on social services and the welfare state for Australasian and European audiences. She has also published in the popular press, and produces Knowing Animals, a fortnightly podcast in which she talks to animal studies scholars about their research. Knowing Animals, which was launched in 2015, includes the main Knowing Animals series and a second series called Protecting Animals, which features interviews with animal advocates about their practical work for animals. The podcast was subsequently taken over by Josh Milburn.

O'Sullivan is a key figure in the "political turn" in animal ethics (i.e., the emergence of animal ethics informed by political theory rather than moral philosophy). In her Animals, Equality and Democracy, O'Sullivan explores the issue of the unequal treatment of members of different species in contemporary societies. However, she draws a distinction between the "external inconsistency" and the "internal inconsistency", with the former being the inconsistency between the treatment of humans and other animals, and the latter being the inconsistency between the treatment of different nonhuman animals. While traditional analyses of the issue have focused on the external inconsistency, O'Sullivan looks to the internal inconsistency. In particular, O'Sullivan argues that those animals who are more visible are offered greater protection under the law. So, for example, while animals used in agriculture are shielded from public view, animals used in sport have relatively high levels of public visibility. In order to illustrate the difference between the visibility of different animals, O'Sullivan examines interviews with animal activists and offers a media content analysis of Australian newspapers. In order to explore legal differences, she examines the legal protection offered to animals in New South Wales, which she compares with the legal protection offered to animals in 19th century England.

This internal inconsistency caused by differential visibility is, O'Sullivan says, not only unjust and morally arbitrary, but also contrary to "the important liberal democratic values of equity and informed public decision making". She proposes a new approach to animal advocacy, suggesting that advocates focus on the internal inconsistency rather than the external inconsistency. Nina Varsava, publishing in the Journal for Critical Animal Studies, offered an unfavourable review of the book, saying that O'Sullivan's criticism of legal protection of animals through the lens of the internal, but not external, inconsistency might make for "good liberal politics", but it made for "bad animal ethics". "O'Sullivan", she said, "chooses political expediency over moral, or, for that matter, logical, integrity". Alasdair Cochrane was more complimentary. He expressed concern that O'Sullivan's "call for liberal principles to be applied consistently to animals is vulnerable to the charge that these principles are not meant for animals", meaning that O'Sullivan would have to respond to the external inconsistency first. Nonetheless, he praised Animals, Equality and Democracy as offering "rigorous analysis, compelling insights, and a persuasive basis on which to build an animal protection strategy that is progressive, nondiscriminatory, and attuned to widely held political beliefs and practices". The book's preface was written by Garner, who praised O'Sullivan's innovative approach.

Selected publications
Books

Considine, Mark, Jenny M. Lewis, Siobhan S. O'Sullivan and Els Sol (2015). Getting Welfare to Work. Oxford: Oxford University Press.

O'Sullivan, Siobhan, Michael McGann, and Mark Considine (2022). Buying and Selling the Poor. Sydney: Sydney University Press.

Edited collections

O'Sullivan, Siobhan, and Robert Garner, eds., (2016). The Political Turn in Animal Ethics. Lanham, Maryland: Rowman & Littlefield.
O'Sullivan, Siobhan, and Mark Considine, eds., (2015). Contracting-out Welfare Services. Haboken, New Jersey: Wiley.

References

External links
Siobhan O'Sullivan at the University of New South Wales

Knowing Animals podcast
Siobhan O'Sullivan at the New Zealand Centre for Human-Animal Studies

Living people
Animal welfare scholars
Australian political scientists
Australian political philosophers
Academic staff of the University of New South Wales
University of Sydney alumni
Year of birth missing (living people)
Women political scientists